The United States and Paraguay have an extensive relationship at the government, business, and personal level. Paraguay is a partner in hemispheric initiatives to improve counter narcotics cooperation, combat money laundering, human trafficking, and other illicit cross-border activities, and adequately protect intellectual property rights. The United States looks to Paraguay, which has tropical forest and riverine resources, to engage in hemispheric efforts to ensure sustainable development. The United States and Paraguay also cooperate in international organizations.

Paraguay has taken significant steps to combat terrorism financing activity in the tri-border area it shares with Argentina and Brazil. It participates in anti terrorism programs and fora, including the "Three Plus One Security Dialogue", with its neighbors and the United States.

The United States strongly supports consolidation of Paraguay's democracy and continued economic reform, the cornerstones of cooperation among countries in the hemisphere. The United States has played important roles in defending Paraguay's democratic institutions, in helping resolve the April 1996 crisis, and in ensuring that the March 1999 change of government took place without further bloodshed.

Bilateral trade with the United States has increased over the last four years, after a steady decline over several years due to a long-term recession of the Paraguayan economy. Although U.S. imports from Paraguay were only $51.28 million in 2005, down from $58.58 million the previous year, U.S. exports to Paraguay in 2005 were $895.53 million, up from $622.87 million in 2004, according to U.S. Customs data. (Not all exports and imports are reflected in Paraguayan government data.) More than a dozen U.S. multinational firms have subsidiaries in Paraguay. These include firms in the computer, agro-industrial, telecom, banking, and other service industries. Some 75 U.S. businesses have agents or representatives in Paraguay, and more than 3,000 U.S. citizens reside in the country.

The U.S. maintains an embassy in Asunción, Paraguay.  The United States Ambassador to Paraguay is Marc Ostfield.

According to the 2012 U.S. Global Leadership Report, 41% of Paraguayans approve of U.S. leadership, with 24% disapproving and 35% uncertain.

Country comparison

U.S. assistance

The U.S. Government has assisted Paraguayan development since 1942. In 2006, Paraguay signed a $34.9 million Millennium Challenge Corporation's (MCC) Threshold Country Program (TCP) with the U.S. focused on supporting Paraguay's effort to combat impunity and informality. Also in 2006, Paraguay signed and ratified an agreement with the U.S. under the Tropical Forest Conservation Act that provides Paraguay with $7.4 million in relief and zeroing out its remaining bilateral debt in exchange for the Paraguayan Government's commitment to conserve and restore tropical forests in the southeastern region of the country. Separately, the U.S. Agency for International Development (USAID) supports programs to strengthen Paraguay's democratic institutions in the areas of civil society, local government and decentralization, national reform of the state, rule-of-law, and anti-corruption. Other important areas of intervention are economic growth, the environment and public health. The total amount of the program was approximately $10 million in fiscal year 2006.

The U.S. Department of State, the Drug Enforcement Administration, the Department of Justice and the Department of Treasury provide technical assistance, equipment, and training to strengthen counter narcotics enforcement, combat trafficking in persons, promote respect for intellectual property rights, and to assist in the development and implementation of money laundering legislation and counter terrorism legislation.

 On December 19, 2003, U.S. and Paraguayan officials signed a new Memorandum of Understanding to strengthen the legal protection and enforcement of intellectual property rights in Paraguay. The MOU was extended in 2006 through the end of 2007.
 Since 2003 the U.S. Government has had a Resident Justice Advisor in Paraguay to support efforts to combat money laundering and terrorist financing and other financial crimes as well as organized crime and corruption.
 In 2006, the State Department's Bureau of International Narcotics and Law Enforcement Affairs (INL) provided Paraguay with $494,000 in assistance to support its efforts to combat narcotics trafficking, money laundering, and violations of intellectual property rights.
 Starting in 2004, a Resident Public Debt Advisor, a Resident Budget Advisor, and a Resident Tax Advisor from the Department of Treasury have been working with Paraguayan counterparts to implement essential reforms.

The Peace Corps has about 160 volunteers working throughout Paraguay on projects ranging from agriculture and natural resources to education, rural health, and urban youth development. 2007 marked the 40th anniversary of the Peace Corps in Paraguay.

The Office of Public Diplomacy also is active in Paraguay, funding Fulbright and other scholarships to the U.S., U.S. scholars to Paraguay, other short- and long-term exchanges, English scholarship programs, donations of books and equipment, and a cultural preservation project to restore Paraguay's National Library.

The U.S. Department of Defense (DoD) provides technical assistance and training to help modernize and professionalize the military, including by promoting respect for human rights and obedience to democratically elected civilian authorities. DoD also provides assistance to impoverished communities through its Humanitarian Assistance Program.

A military training agreement with Asunción, giving immunity to US soldiers, caused concern after media reports initially reported that a base housing 20,000 US soldiers was being built at Mariscal Estigarribia within 200 km of Argentina and Bolivia, and 300 km of Brazil, near an airport which could receive large planes (B-52, C-130 Hercules, etc.) which the Paraguan Air Forces do not have.

In September 2009 Paraguay's President Fernando Lugo revoked plans for US troops to hold joint military exercises and development projects after stating that he no longer thinks that hosting troops taking part in the US department of defence's "New Horizons" programme was worthwhile. President Lugo referenced strong regional opposition from countries such as Argentina, Brazil, Venezuela, Bolivia and Ecuador to the expansion of US military bases in Colombia in his decision.

Conflicts

In 1858, the Paraguay expedition was of gunboat diplomacy where the US sent a naval squadron to Paraguay to seek redress from Paraguay for the shelling of the USS Water Witch in 1855. It was quickly concluded after the force landed at Asunción on January 25, 1859, and followed by a Treaty of Amity and Commerce on February 4, 1859.

See also
Paraguayan Americans

References

External links
 History of Paraguay – U.S. relations

Further reading
 Hanratty, Dennis M., and Sandra Meditz. Paraguay: A County Study (U.S. Government Printing Office, 1990). online
 McQuilkin, Christopher. "'An Excellent Laboratory': US Foreign Aid in Paraguay, 1942-1954." (U of Oregon thesis 2014) online. 
 Miller, Olivia. "Paraguayan Americans." Gale Encyclopedia of Multicultural America, edited by Thomas Riggs, (3rd ed., vol. 3, Gale, 2014), pp. 459–466. online
 Miranda, Anibal. United States-Paraguay Relations: The Eisenhower Years (Washington, DC.: Wilson Center, 1990).
 Miranda, Carlos R. The Stroessner Era: Authoritarian Rule in Paraguay (Westview Press, 1990).
 Mora, Frank O., and Jerry Wilson Cooney. Paraguay and the United States: distant allies (U of Georgia Press, 2010).
 Mora, Frank O. "The Forgotten Relationship: United States-Paraguay Relations, 1937-89." Journal of Contemporary History 33.3 (1998): 451-473 online.

 
Bilateral relations of the United States
United States